Ab Qorqoru (also Romanized as Āb Qorqorū) is a village in Paskhan Rural District, in the Central District of Darab County, Fars Province, Iran. At the 2006 census, its population was 36, in 8 families.

References 

Populated places in Darab County